The 1996 Peterborough City Council election took place on 2 May 1996 to elect members of Peterborough City Council in England. This was on the same day as other local elections.

Election result

Ward results

Barnack

Bretton

Central

Dogsthorpe

East

Fletton

Glinton

North

Orton Longueville

Park

Paston

Ravensthorpe

Stanground

Walton

Werrington

West

References

1996
1990s in Cambridgeshire
Peterborough